Chevy Stevens (born 1973  as Rene Unischewski) is a Canadian author of thriller novels. She lives on Vancouver Island, British Columbia.

Stevens was working as a realtor when she got the idea for her novel Still Missing, in which a real estate agent is abducted while holding an open house. Her book Still Missing was a New York Times bestseller, <ref>{{Cite news|title=The New York Times|url=https://www.nytimes.com/best-sellers-books/2010-08-08/hardcover-fiction/list.html? | first=Jennifer | last=Schuessler}}</ref> and the winner of the 2011 International Thriller Writers Award for Best First Novel.

BibliographyStill Missing, St. Martin's Press, 2010 - A real estate named Annie O'Sullivan is abducted by a man she calls "The Freak" during an open house. She's held captive in a cabin in the mountains.Never Knowing, St. Martin's Press, 2011Always Watching, St. Martin's Press, 2013
"The Other Side" (short story, St. Martin's Press, 2013That Night, St. Martin's Press, 2014Those Girls, St. Martin's Press, 2015 - Three sisters murder their dad and run away from home, trying to form a new life without getting caught for their crime.Never Let You Go, St. Martin's Press, 2017Dark Roads'', St. Martin's Press, 2021

References

External links
http://www.chevystevens.com/
http://us.macmillan.com/author/chevystevens

Living people
1973 births
21st-century Canadian novelists
Canadian women novelists
People from Vancouver Island
Writers from British Columbia
21st-century Canadian women writers
Canadian mystery writers
Women mystery writers